"This Magic Moment" is a song composed by lyricist Doc Pomus and pianist Mort Shuman. It was first recorded by The Drifters, with Ben E. King singing lead.

Original Drifters version
It was recorded first by Ben E. King and the Drifters, at Bell Sound Studios in New York City. The Drifters version spent 11 weeks on the Billboard Hot 100 and reached No. 16 on April 2, 1960.

Chart history

Jay and the Americans version
In 1968, Jay and the Americans released a version of the song, which became the song's most widely successful release.  Their version spent 14 weeks on the Billboard Hot 100, reaching No. 6 on March 1, 1969, while reaching No. 1 on Canada's "RPM 100" and No. 11 on Billboard's Easy Listening chart. The song also debuted at No. 4 in the first issue of RPM's "Young Adult" adult contemporary chart.  The single earned gold record status from the Recording Industry Association of America.

Chart history

Weekly charts

Year-end charts

In popular culture
The original version of the song was used in the following productions:
 The Sandlot, the 1993 sports comedy film directed by David M. Evans
 "Soprano Home Movies", an episode of The Sopranos
 "This Magic Moment", a documentary film from ESPN's 30 for 30 about the Orlando Magic
 "Selena Gomez/Post Malone", an episode from the 47th season of Saturday Night Live, in a sketch about the invention of the whoopee cushion

Lou Reed's version, from a Doc Pomus tribute album, Till the Night is Gone, was featured in David Lynch's film Lost Highway (1997).

References

External links
 http://aln2.albumlinernotes.com/Atlantic_-_Volume_Four.html

1960 singles
1969 singles
Songs with lyrics by Doc Pomus
Songs with music by Mort Shuman
The Drifters songs
Jay and the Americans songs
Lou Reed songs
1960 songs
United Artists Records singles
Atlantic Records singles
RPM Top Singles number-one singles